Wembley is a town in northern Alberta, Canada.

History
Land around Wembley was surveyed for homesteads in 1909, settlers beginning to arrive in 1910. The railroad survey was completed from Grande Prairie to Pouce Coupe in 1916 and the townsite of Wembley was surveyed in 1923. The railway arrived in 1924.

The present town-site is four and a half miles south of the original hamlet of Lake Saskatoon and when the railway arrived in 1924 many buildings were hauled over the four and one half miles of snow-covered trails from Lake Saskatoon to their new foundations in Wembley. The name Wembley was chosen by the Lake Saskatoon Board of Trade at the time of the British Empire Exposition at Wembley in England.

The post office opened in November 1924, the first postmaster being RB Sinclair.

Wembley reached village status January 3, 1928 and town status August 1, 1980.

Demographics 

In the 2016 Census of Population conducted by Statistics Canada, the Town of Wembley recorded a population of 1,516 living in 565 of its 618 total private dwellings, a  change from its 2011 population of 1,383.

The Town of Wembley's 2012 municipal census counted a population of 1,410.

See also 
List of communities in Alberta
List of towns in Alberta

References

External links 

1928 establishments in Alberta
Towns in Alberta